Giosuè Fioriti (born 3 May 1989, in Gubbio) is an Italian football forward who currently plays for A.S. Gualdo Calcio.

Appearances on Italian Series 

Serie C2 : 1 App

Eccellenza : 3 Apps

Total : 4 Apps

See also 
Football in Italy
List of football clubs in Italy

References

External links 
http://www.gualdocalcio.it/squadra0910/fioriti.htm

Living people
1989 births
Italian footballers
A.S. Gubbio 1910 players
Association football forwards